Terry Ray (born April 10, 1963) is an American former professional boxer who competed from 1986 to 2001. He held the WBF cruiserweight title from 1999 to 2000 and challenged once for the WBA cruiserweight title in 1998. As an amateur, he defeated 95 of 104 opponents, winning several state and national championships, and earning himself a spot on Team USA to compete against Scandinavia

During his professional career, Ray was trained by distinguished trainers Kevin Rooney (1991–1992) and Angelo Dundee (1993–1998). Since retiring from boxing in 2001, Ray has remained active in the sport as a trainer to both professional and amateur fighters, including son Tucker Ray, who he trained to win multiple state championships.

Early life 
Terry Ray was born on April 10, 1963, in Terre Haute, Indiana. Ray is the grandson of former five-term mayor of Terre Haute, Ralph Tucker. Ray began boxing in Indiana at a young age to gain an amateur record of 95-9 and going on to win the Indiana Golden Gloves multiple times. In 1985, Ray defeated Melton Bowen in the finals to win the National Police Athletic League Tournament. Also as an amateur after training at the Olympic Training Center in Colorado Springs, Ray earned himself a spot on team USA vs. Scandinavia.
Ray is a graduate of Indiana State University.

Professional career 

Ray began his professional boxing career in 1986, debuting his first two fights on ESPN. In 1991–1992, Ray trained in Catskill, New York under Kevin Rooney, winning 12 fights on the east coast. From 1993 to 1998, Ray trained with Angelo Dundee in Hollywood, Florida. In 1994, Ray fought on CBS against WBF Champion Kenny Keene. The fight between Keene on October 8th ended in a decision loss for Ray. 

In 1997, Ray fought former WBA champion Robert Daniels on USA Tuesday Night Fights withRay losing a split decision. Announcer Sean O'Grady had Ray winning the bout 7–3. In 1998, Ray challenged for the WBA cruiserweight title against Fabrice Tiozzo in Lyon, France. He lost to Tiozzo by first round knockout. Ray went on to win the WBF title in 1999 and defended it three times before losing it to Bash Ali in Lagos, Nigeria. Ray was inducted into the 2020 class of the Indiana Boxing Hall of Fame.

Outside of boxing
In 2012, Ray was convicted of sexual battery involving a 14 year old girl, receiving an 18 month suspended prison sentence.

Professional boxing record

References 

1963 births
Living people
Boxers from Indiana
American male boxers
Cruiserweight boxers